Cesar Bielich-Pomareda (1874–1950) was the Minister of the Navy of Peru in the 1930s. He retired with the rank of rear-admiral of the navy.

External links
 Visit the memorial to Cesar Beilich

Bielich-Pomareda,Cesar
1874 births
1950 deaths
Peruvian military officers
Government ministers of Peru